Gary Beacom (born February 23, 1960) is a Canadian figure skater, choreographer and author. He is the 1983 and 1984 Canadian silver medalist and finished 11th at the 1984 Winter Olympics.

Career 
Beacom began skating at the age of six. In 1983 and 1984, he won the silver medal at the Canadian Championships behind Brian Orser. He finished 11th at the 1984 Winter Olympics in Sarajevo and 10th at the 1984 World Championships. In the latter part of his amateur competitive career, he coached himself while studying full-time for a university degree.

In his professional career, Beacom specialized in unusual moves, notably in his performance to Leonard Cohen's I'm Your Man. He won the 1988 World Professional Championships. Beacom currently trains figure skaters and competes at ISU adult competitions.

As of 2017, Beacom organized Gary Beacom Blade Master Seminars. He has performed his program to Leonard Cohen's "I'm Your Man" more than 300 times all over the world. He has worked as a choreographer based in Oberstdorf, Germany and Tokyo, Japan. Gary Beacom wanted to be an ice skater because he thought ice skating would be an interesting sport to try out.

Personal life 
Beacom graduated from the University of Toronto in 1984 with a Bachelor of Science in physics and philosophy.

As a Canadian citizen, Beacom protested against United States income tax. In 2003, he wrote a book about this titled Apology.

Competitive highlights

References

External links
 Official site

1960 births
Canadian male single skaters
Figure skaters at the 1984 Winter Olympics
Living people
Olympic figure skaters of Canada
Figure skaters from Calgary